is the 8th single by Mika Nakashima. It peaked on the Oricon weekly charts at #4 and sold roughly 38,429 copies.

Outline
Nakashima covered Original Love's fifth single  released in 1993.
This single was limited the production to 50,000 copies.

Track listing

References

2003 singles
Mika Nakashima songs